DYW may refer to:

Daly Waters Airport (IATA code: DYW), Daly Waters, Northern Territory, Australia

See also
KeDyw, a Polish World War II Home Army unit